The Yemeni Super Cup is a Yemenian association football trophy contested in an annual match between the champions of the Yemeni League and the winners of the Yemeni Cup.

Winners &, Runners up

By year

Championships by team

See also
 Yemeni League
 Yemeni Cup

References

External links
Yemen - List of Cup Winners, RSSSF.com

2
Yemen
Recurring sporting events established in 2007
2007 establishments in Yemen